Milano Porta Vittoria is an underground railway station in Milan, Italy. It opened in 2004 as part of the Milan Passante railway, as its south-eastern gate. The station is located on Viale Molise.

Services 
Milano Porta Vittoria is served by lines S1, S2, S5, S6, S12 and S13 of the Milan suburban railway service, operated by the Lombard railway company Trenord.

See also 
Railway stations in Milan
Milan suburban railway service
Milan Passante railway

References

External links 

Porta Vittoria
Railway stations opened in 2004
Milan S Lines stations
2004 establishments in Italy
Railway stations located underground in Italy
Railway stations in Italy opened in the 21st century